Karpara Dam, is an earthfill dam on Karpara river near Jintur, Parbhani district in state of Maharashtra in India.

Specifications

Purpose
 Irrigation

See also
 Dams in Maharashtra
 List of reservoirs and dams in India

References

Dams in Parbhani district
Dams completed in 1975
1975 establishments in Maharashtra